The Des O'Connor Show is a British variety and chat show hosted by Des O'Connor which was broadcast on ITV from 1963 until 1973.

History
Associated Television produced the programme, which was recorded in black-and-white for the first six series.

When the seventh series of the show aired in colour in 1970, its popularity spread internationally. ITV licensed the programme to the National Broadcasting Company (NBC) in the United States, where it aired during prime time, and continued for one more series. Some entertainment celebrities of the time, such as Patrick Newell and Dom DeLuise, made multiple guest appearances on the show.

In the United States, NBC retitled the programme to Kraft Music Hall Presents the Des O'Connor Show, after their own popular variety show Kraft Music Hall, which also ended in 1971.

ITV transmissions

Series

Specials

DVD
A DVD release Des O'Connor Volume 1 (22 June 2009) collects various highlights from Kraft Music Hall Presents the Des O'Connor Show.

See also
Des O'Connor Tonight (1977–2002)

References

External links
 The Des O'Connor Show at BFI
  
 Des O'Connor's official website

1963 British television series debuts
1973 British television series endings
1960s American variety television series
1970s American variety television series
British television talk shows
English-language television shows
Television series by ITC Entertainment
Television shows produced by Associated Television (ATV)
Television shows shot at ATV Elstree Studios